The Centre de documentation collégiale (CDC) is a specialised library in education for all the post-secondary colleges and CEGEP in the province of Quebec, Canada. It is located in Montreal (LaSalle), Québec, Canada.

External links
Centre de documentation collégiale

Libraries in Quebec